Mianaj or Miyanaj may refer to:
 Mianaj, Mahneshan
 Mianaj, Anguran, Mahneshan County